The Muzaffarabad Division is a first-order administrative division of the Pakistani dependent territory of Azad Kashmir. It comprises the portion of the former Muzaffarabad District of the princely state of Jammu and Kashmir that came under Pakistani control at the end of the Indo-Pakistani War of 1947.

Districts

Currently, the Muzaffarabad Division consists of the following districts:

 Hattian Bala District
 Muzaffarabad District
 Neelam District

References
 

Azad Kashmir
Divisions of Pakistan